Religious trauma syndrome (RTS) is recognized in psychology and psychotherapy as a set of symptoms, ranging in severity, experienced by those who have participated in or left behind authoritarian, dogmatic, and controlling religious groups and belief systems. Symptoms include cognitive, affective, functional, and social/cultural issues as well as developmental delays.

RTS occurs in response to two-fold trauma: first the prolonged abuse of indoctrination from a controlling religious community, and secondly the act of leaving the controlling religious community. RTS has developed as its own heuristic collection of symptoms informed by psychological theories of trauma originating in PTSD, C-PTSD and betrayal trauma theory, taking relational and social context into account when approaching further research and treatment.

The term "religious trauma syndrome" was coined in 2011 by psychologist Marlene Winell in an article for British Association for Behavioural and Cognitive Psychotherapies, though the phenomenon was recognized long before that. The term has circulated among psychotherapists, former fundamentalists, and others recovering from religious indoctrination. Winell explains the need for a label and the benefits of naming the symptoms encompassed by RTS as similar to naming anorexia as a disorder: the label can lessen shame and isolation for survivors while promoting diagnosis, treatment, and training for professionals who work with those suffering from the condition. Survivors report relief when they find out that RTS is "real."

Symptoms 
As symptoms of religious trauma syndrome, psychologists have recognized dysfunctions that vary in number and severity from person to person.

Cognitive: Confusion, difficulty with decision-making and critical thinking, dissociation, identity confusion
Affective: Anxiety, panic attacks, depression, suicidal ideation, anger, grief, guilt, loneliness, lack of meaning
Functional: Sleep and eating disorders, nightmares, sexual dysfunction, substance abuse, somatization
Social/cultural: Rupture of family and social network, employment issues, financial stress, problems acculturating into society, interpersonal dysfunction
Developmental delay:  emotional, intellectual, social, and sexual immaturity resulting from the control of information and discouragement of critical thinking within the religious environment.

Religious trauma has also been linked to severe results such as suicide and homicide.

How RTS develops

Membership 
RTS begins in toxic religious environments centered around two basic narratives: "You are not okay" and "You are not safe." These ideas are often enforced with theology such as the Christian doctrines of original sin and hell.

The development of RTS can be compared to the development of Complex PTSD, defined as a psychological disorder that can develop in response to prolonged, repeated experience of interpersonal trauma in a context in which the individual has little or no chance of escape. Symptoms of RTS are a natural response to the perceived existence of a violent, all-powerful God who finds humans inherently defective, along with regular exposure to religious leaders who use threat of eternal death, unredeemable life, demon possession and many other frightening ideas to control religious devotion and submission of group members.

Members of the LGBTQIA+ community are at particular risk of RTS and C-PTSD as they attempt, over an extended period of time, to alter their sexual orientation and gender identity to fit the expectations of authoritarian religious communities. The process of attempting to alter one's orientation can create emotionally abusive thought patterns prone to exacerbate the C-PTSD-like symptoms of RTS. Chronically living in fear of eternal damnation and lifelong separation from loved ones and religious communities if they fail to comply to sexual identity restrictions can induce long-term symptoms of RTS.

Leaving 
Leaving a controlling religious community, while often experienced as liberating and exciting, can be experienced as a major traumatic event. Religious communities often serve as the foundation for individuals' lives, providing social support, a coherent worldview, a sense of meaning and purpose, and social and emotional satisfaction. Leaving behind all those resources goes beyond a significant loss; it calls on the individual to completely reconstruct their reality, often while newly isolated from the help and support of family and friends who stay in the religion.

In addition, when violent or threatening theology, such as a belief in hell, divine punishment, demons, and an evil "outside world," have been incorporated into the basic structure of an individual's worldview, the threats of engaging the outside world instead of remaining in the safe bubble of the controlling religious community can induce further anxiety.

As individuals identify the harm they are experiencing in authoritarian religious settings, their concerns may be minimized by the religious group itself, but can also be compounded by society's investment in positive views of religion. Institutional betrayal, first at the hands of beloved religious communities, second at the hands of a world that upholds the utility of religion rather than the experiences of religious abuse survivors, can make symptoms of RTS worse. People leaving religion can experience extreme hostility from their former co-religionists.

Antecedents to RTS 
The development of RTS as a diagnosable and treatable set of symptoms relies on several psychological theories that provide an academic framework with which to understand it.

PTSD 
Like all iterations of trauma, the development of RTS is informed by PTSD, defined in DSM V as a mental disorder that can develop after a person is exposed to a traumatic event, such as sexual assault, warfare, traffic collisions, child abuse, or other threats on a person's life. These events can be personally experienced, observed, or imagined. The important element is the perception of life-threatening danger. In the case of RTS, a person can be traumatized by images of burning hellfire; fundamentalist groups are noted for using terrifying stories to indoctrinate children.

The experience of leaving one's faith can be an event that takes place quickly or over a period of time. Because of the overall intensity and major impact of the event, it can be compared with other events that cause PTSD. Key symptoms of PTSD are re-experiencing (flashbacks, nightmares), avoidance (staying away from places, things, and thoughts that are reminders), arousal and reactivity, and cognition and mood disturbances. These symptoms are also true for many experiencing religious trauma.

Complex PTSD 
Complex PTSD is a closely related disorder that refers to repeated trauma over months or years, rather than a one-time event. Any type of long-term trauma, can lead to CPTSD. However, it seems to appear frequently in people who have been abused by someone who was supposed to be their caregiver or protector. The term CPTSD was originated by Judith Herman, who outlines the history of trauma as a concept in the psychological world along with a three-stage approach for recovery (safety, remembrance and mourning, and reconnection). Herman outlines the importance of naming and diagnosing trauma to aid recovery, further legitimizing the need for defining RTS as resulting from specifically religious experiences. Herman also describes CPTSD with the traumatic complications of surviving captivity. This is a diagnosis comparable to RTS in which RTS occurs in response to perceived captivity (see #How RTS develops) rather than physical reality.

The symptoms of CPTSD include those of PTSD plus lack of emotional regulation, disassociation, negative self-perception, relationship issues, loss of meaning and others that also compare to RTS. Traumatologist Pete Walker sees attachment disorder as one of the key symptoms of Complex PTSD.  He describes it as the result of growing up with primary caretakers who were regularly experienced as dangerous. He explains that recurring abuse and neglect habituates children to living in fear and sympathetic nervous system arousal.

Betrayal trauma and shattered assumptions theory 
While the traditional paradigm defining PTSD focuses on fear response to trauma and emphasizes corrective emotional processing as treatment, RTS may be better understood as a set of symptoms comparable to betrayal trauma  informed by shattered assumptions theory. Betrayal trauma adds a fourth assumption ("people are trustworthy and worth relating to") to Janoff-Bulman's original three: (the overall benevolence of the world, the meaningfulness of the world, and self worth). Betrayal trauma theory acknowledges that victims unconsciously keep themselves from becoming aware of betrayal in order to keep from shattering that fourth basic assumption, the loss of which would be traumatic.

Religious trauma can be compared to betrayal trauma because of the trust placed in authoritarian communities and religious leaders causing harm to individuals. Betrayal trauma theory also acknowledges the power of shattered assumptions in causing trauma. With RTS, individuals are not only experiencing betrayal from family, religious community, and trusted faith leaders, they are also experiencing a shattered faith. The potential extremity of feelings in relation to losing one's worldview while also losing emotional and social support to get through any given crisis can cause further trauma.

While fear paradigms tend to focus on treating symptoms of trauma through exposure therapy and attention to emotional regulation, betrayal trauma theory looks at the social context in which the betrayal occurred, placing the pathology in the traumatic event rather than the individual. This affects treatment approaches and also informs the treatment for RTS.

Religious harm and trauma 
The psychological harm that can be caused by authoritarian religion has been addressed by authors prior to the naming of religious trauma syndrome. These writings have included work by psychologists and therapists (Tarico, Ray, Winell, Kramer & Alstad, Hassan, Cohen, Watters, Greven, Moyers), and many memoirs from former believers, including former pastors (Babinski, Loftus, Barker, DeWitt). The work of cult specialist Stephen Hassan applies to any authoritarian group that applies "undue influence." Journalist Janet Heimlich, in her research on child maltreatment in religious communities, identified the most damaging groups as having a Bible belief system that creates an authoritarian, isolative, threat-based model of reality.

Related empirical research

Stress 
Medical research in the area of stress and traumatic events reveals evidence of resulting disease and mental illness. The work on "stressful life events," while neglecting to specifically list religious harm or leaving one's faith as stressful events, shows very clearly how stress can activate the nervous system and cause disease. Studies on animals suggest that trauma can have lasting effects on the amygdala, hippocampus, and prefrontal cortex.

Adverse childhood experiences 
The Adverse Childhood Experiences Study by Kaiser Permanente and the Centers for Disease Control has demonstrated an association of adverse childhood experiences (ACEs) with health and social problems across the lifespan. Among the listed types of adverse experiences were physical, sexual, and emotional abuse as well as physical and emotional neglect. A case could be made that these are also frequent elements of religious harm.

According to cognitive and neuroscience researchers, adverse childhood experiences can alter the structural development of neural networks and the biochemistry of neuroendocrine systems and may have long-term effects on the body, including speeding up the processes of disease and aging and compromising immune systems. In a review of numerous empirical studies, it was found that child abuse is associated with markedly elevated rates of major depression and other psychiatric disorders in adulthood.

In studies that find a correlation between extreme fundamentalism and brain damage, it is suggested that extreme religious indoctrination harms the development or proper functioning of the prefrontal regions in a way that hinders cognitive flexibility and openness.

Research on religious trauma 
To date, most research on religious trauma has been qualitative research with an individualistic, experiential focus. These have been interview-based or case studies from clinical practice. There have been a few quantitative studies, such as Milton's survey of 295 former Exclusive Brethren members. She found that the overall measure of psychological distress was significantly higher amongst the leavers when compared to the general population.

Treatment and tasks of recovery 
Mental health professionals, life coaches, and individuals practicing pastoral care have been developing approaches to treating RTS. While exposure therapy is not recommended, trauma-focused cognitive behavioral therapy, group therapy combined with one-on-one sessions, trauma-informed psychoeducation, trauma processing, and grief work can all be beneficial. In Winell's approach, treatment is most effective when holistic and multi-modal. That is, treatment needs to address the cognitive, affective, physiological, and relational dimensions of the person, all in a societal context.

Treatment of RTS has been influenced by modern thinking about treating trauma of all kinds. From this "trauma-informed" perspective, it is important to recognize individual differences and locate the actual trauma in the nervous system of the individual. According to Walker, importance elements of trauma recovery involve shrinking the inner critic, the role of grieving, and the need to be able to stay self-compassionately present to dysphoric affect.

In medicine, "trauma-informed" care is defined as practices that promote a culture of safety, empowerment, and healing.

Group support appears to be an effective treatment for recovery from religious trauma and numerous services have developed to offer this, including professional recovery groups, 
peer support groups, and online 
forums. These may be effective because 1) those in recovery have lost primary support systems of family and church, 2) social support is a primary human need and relevant in understanding the physiology of trauma, and the social context of treatment helps people feel less alone or at fault.

While some liberal churches offer therapy, professional therapists take the view that treatment should be in a neutral environment, and not in a religious context.

Tasks of recovery 
Recovery involves assessing each symptom area for growth and exploration:

Cognitive tasks:
 developing critical thinking skills 
 providing psychoeducation about RTS 
 offering decision-making frameworks 
 fostering good mental hygiene (e.g. avoiding black and white thinking or judgmentalism)
 re-establishing a sense of personal identity
Affective tasks:
 exploring coping skills for emotional dysregulation  
 habitual steps for dealing with emotional flashbacks.
Functional tasks:
 establishing healthy sleeping and eating patterns
 providing sex education in an effort to promote healthy sexuality 
 reconnecting with the body through somatic techniques.
Social/cultural tasks:
 discovering and/or establishing a social network outside of the controlling faith community 
 cultivating financial stability 
 learning how to acculturate into society  
 developing interpersonal skills such as perspective-taking.

Many developmental tasks overlap with cognitive, affective, functional, and social/cultural tasks. Developmental tasks of recovery focus on recognizing developmental delay and providing necessary education in critical thinking, sexual health, mental hygiene, and socialization to allow natural human development to continue.

Growing awareness 

Discussion about religious trauma syndrome is becoming more widespread in the media, including major, mainstream outlets. 
and internet sources of news. Awareness is becoming global, in terms of people seeking help and in the news.

While much of the work on religious trauma has centered on fundamentalist Christianity, applications have been made to other groups such as Mormonism, 
Jehovah's Witnesses,
Children of God,
Orthodox Judaism, 
the Unification Church, 
and some fundamentalist groups in Islam.  
Personal journeys out of fundamentalist religion have been the subject of numerous films in addition to previously mentioned books and memoirs.

Further research 
To recognize RTS, it is not necessary to say that all religion and spirituality is harmful. It appears that certain kinds of religion, typically fundamentalist and patriarchal, have both toxic teachings and toxic practices. The damage done is through these mechanisms. Of course any religious group can also have healthy teachings and healthy practices.  Rather than deciding whether religion in general is toxic or healthy, a more productive pursuit would be to study the mechanisms that cause damage.

In 2019, the Religious Trauma Institute was founded by therapists Laura Anderson and Brian Peck. Currently, the Institute is conducting a survey on what they are calling Adverse Religious Experiences. While this will provide a point of comparison to the research on Adverse Childhood Experiences, there is a need for longitudinal studies to examine actual patterns of causation.

See also
 Religious abuse

References

External links 
 Website of the Religious Trauma Institute

Barriers to critical thinking
Post-traumatic stress disorder
Adverse childhood experiences
Trauma types
Religion and mental health
Psychology and religious fundamentalism